is a retired Japanese volleyball player. She served as captain for the national team from 2009 to 2012.  She competed at the 2012 Summer Olympics winning a bronze medal, and 2020 Summer Olympics, in Women's volleyball which she was the captain.

Career 
Araki began her professional volleyball career with the Toray Arrows from 2003 to 2008. In July 2008, she joined Foppapedretti Bergamo. Araki returned to the Arrows the following season. From 2010 to 2013, Araki served as team captain. On 18 June 2013, the team announced her marriage. On 10 October 2013, Toray announced her pregnancy. Araki joined the Ageo Medics in 2014 then Toyota Auto Body Queenseis.

Personal life
Her father was a rugby player at Waseda University. Her mother was a PE teacher.
She was good at swimming and athletics as a child.
She became a volleyball player at 10 years old. At this age she was already 5 feet tall.
While attending Seitoku Gakuen High School with Kana Oyama, the volleyball team were national high school champions.
She has one daughter.

Awards

Individual 
2004 The 10th Women's V.League - Best 6
2006 The 12th Women's V.League - Best 6
2007–08 Women's V.Premier League -  Most Valuable Player, Spike awards, Block awards, Best 6
2008 2008 Summer Olympics "Best Blocker"
2009–2010 V.Premier League - Spike awards
2010–2011 V.Premier League - Best 6
2011-2012 V.Premier League - MVP, Block awards, Best 6
2012-2013 V.Premier League - Excellent player awards, Block awards, Spike awards, Best server awards and Best 6

Team
2004 Kurowashiki All Japan Volleyball Tournament -  Champion, with Toray Arrows
2007 Domestic Sports Festival (Volleyball) -  Champion, with Toray Arrows
2007–2008 Empress's Cup -  Champion, with Toray Arrows
2007–2008 V.Premier League -  Champion, with Toray Arrows
2008-09 Champions League -  Champion, with Volley Bergamo
2009–10 V.Premier League -  Champion, with Toray Arrows
2010 Kurowashiki All Japan Volleyball Tournament -  Champion, with Toray Arrows
2010–11 V.Premier League -  Runner-up, with Toray Arrows
2011 Empress's Cup -  Champion, with Toray Arrows
2011–12 V.Premier League -  Champion, with Toray Arrows
2012-2013 V.Premier League -  Runner-up, with Toray Arrows

National team

Senior team
2006: 6th place in the 2006 FIVB Women's World Championship in Japan
2007: 7th place in the 2007 FIVB Women's World Cup in Japan
2008: 5th place in the Volleyball at the 2008 Summer Olympics – Women's tournament in Beijing, 3rd place in the 2008 Asian Women's Cup Volleyball Championship in Nakhon Ratchasima
2009: 3rd place in the 2009 Asian Women's Volleyball Championship in vietnam
2010: 3rd place in the World Championship in Japan
2011 Montreux Volley Masters -  Champion
2011 4th place in the World Cup in Japan
2012: 3rd place in the Volleyball at the 2012 Summer Olympics – Women's tournament in London
 2017 Asian Women's Volleyball Championship -  Champion

References

External links
 FIVB biography
 Toray Arrows Women's Volleyball Team
 
 
 Japanese news:the move from Toray Arrows to Bergamo
 
 Araki Erika: Looking to Lead Women’s National Volleyball Team to Tokyo Glory at nippon.com

Volleyball players at the 2008 Summer Olympics
1984 births
Living people
People from Kurashiki
Olympic volleyball players of Japan
Volleyball players at the 2012 Summer Olympics
Olympic bronze medalists for Japan
Olympic medalists in volleyball
Japanese women's volleyball players
Medalists at the 2012 Summer Olympics
Volleyball players at the 2016 Summer Olympics
Asian Games medalists in volleyball
Volleyball players at the 2006 Asian Games
Volleyball players at the 2018 Asian Games
Volleyball players at the 2020 Summer Olympics
Asian Games silver medalists for Japan
Japan women's international volleyball players
Medalists at the 2006 Asian Games
21st-century Japanese women